Oak Creek Township is one of twenty-four townships in Saunders County, Nebraska, United States. The population was 932 at the 2020 census, 40.8% of whom were of Czech ancestry, the second highest percentage of Czech-Americans in the United States. A 2021 estimate placed the township's population at 943.

The Village of Valparaiso lies within the township.

See also
County government in Nebraska

References

External links
City-Data.com

Czech-American culture in Nebraska
Townships in Saunders County, Nebraska
Townships in Nebraska